INS Gaj is an offshore tugboat built by Hindustan Shipyard Limited, Visakhapatnam for the Indian Navy. It operated under the navy's Eastern Naval Command.

Description
Gaj is powered by twin Wartsila diesel engines having a power of 1421 hp (1,060 kW). The propulsion is provided by two Volth Schneider propellers which allows for a 360 degree turn on the spot. The rated bollard pull is 25 tonnes. The ship can achieve a speed in excess of 12 knots with an endurance of ten days. It is fitted with a six-tonne hydraulic deck crane and fire fighting equipment, and is also fitted with diving and salvage equipment. It has a complement of 22 sailors.

Commissioning 
It was commissioned on 10 October 2002 in Eastern Naval Command (ENC) by the Commander-in-Chief, Vice-Admiral Raman Puri. The ship has been named after the previous Gaj class tugboat INS Gaj (with the pennant number A-51) built by Garden Reach Shipbuilders & Engineers, Kolkata commissioned in September 1973.

Gallery

See also
Tugboats of the Indian Navy

References

External links
Maritime Connector

Auxiliary ships of the Indian Navy
Tugs of the Indian Navy